Heat Biologics Inc. is a US biotechnology company focused on the field of immunotherapy. Heat Biologics was founded by Jeff Wolf and Eckhard Podack, in conjunction with the University of Miami and Seed-One Ventures. The company is based in Morrisville, North Carolina.

History
In 2008, Heat Biologics was founded by Jeff Wolf and Eckhard Podack, in conjunction with the University of Miami and Seed-One Ventures. The company relocated to North Carolina in 2011. NCBiotech provided $225,000 of initial funding the same year.

On July 24, 2013, Heat Biologics stock went public on NASDAQ under ticker symbol HTBX.

In 2017, Heat Biologics acquired an 80% controlling interest in Pelican Therapeutics. 

Morrisville, North Carolina became the company's headquarters in 2019.

In 2020, the Leonard M. Miller School of Medicine collaborated with Heat Biologics to develop a COVID-19 vaccine using gp-96 to express antigens associated with COVID-19.

In 2021, Heat Biologics began Phase 2 clinical trials for a new non-small cell lung cancer treatment (HS-110). It also initiated a Phase 1 trial for HS-130, its off-the-shelf cell line engineered to stimulate T-cells to assist in immune response to disease.

Pipeline products

HS-110
HS-110, also called viagenpumatucel-L, is in Phase II in NSCLC, in combination with cyclophosphamide. Another Phase I study is combining HS 110 with nivolumab and other checkpoint inhibitors.

HS-130
HS-130 is in Phase I clinical trial for patients with solid tumors. HS-130 is an allogeneic (“off-the-shelf”) cell line engineered to express OX40 ligand fusion protein (OX40L-Fc). OX40 ligand is a key co-stimulator of T cells that augments antigen-specific CD8+ T cell responses.

COVID-19 Vaccine
The company initiated a COVID-19 vaccine collaboration with the University of Miami in March 2020 using their gp96 platform which activates the human immune system to combat infectious diseases with the potential of generating long-term immune responses.

PTX-35
PTX-35 is in Phase I clinical trial for patients with solid tumors. PTX-35 is a potential first-in-class T cell co-stimulator targeting TNFRSF25 (Death Receptor 3). Favorable safety profile was demonstrated in mice and non-human primates. PTX-35’s development plan focuses on cancer immunotherapy.

References 

Biotechnology companies of the United States
Companies listed on the Nasdaq